Naoufal Boumina (born 15 November 1993 in Belgium) is a Belgian footballer.

Career
Boumina left Charleroi because of his coach, who he claimed was racist. After that, he played for the reserves of Getafe and Atletico Madrid in Spain, training with the first team on one occasion. In 2017, Boumina signed for Wydad Casabalanca, the most successful club in Morocco, where he won the league and CAF Champions League. Afterwards, he would say Wydad was the highlight of his career.

References

Belgian footballers
Living people
Association football forwards
Association football midfielders
Association football wingers
K.R.C. Mechelen players
ACS Foresta Suceava players
1993 births